The 2022 Ole Miss Rebels baseball team represented the University of Mississippi in the 2022 NCAA Division I baseball season. The Rebels played their home games at Swayze Field.

Previous season

The Rebels finished 45–22, 18–12 in the SEC to finish in third place in the West division. They hosted and won the Oxford Regional as the No. 12 national seed before falling to No. 5 Arizona in game three of the Tucson Super Regional.

Schedule and results

Standings

Results

Roster

See also
2022 Ole Miss Rebels softball team

References

Ole Miss
Ole Miss Rebels baseball seasons
Ole Miss Rebels baseball
College World Series seasons
Ole
NCAA Division I Baseball Championship seasons